Roy Wood Sellars (July 9, 1880, Seaforth, Ontario – September 5, 1973, Ann Arbor, Michigan) was a Canadian-born American philosopher of critical realism and religious humanism, and a proponent of naturalistic emergent evolution (which he called evolutionary naturalism). Sellars received his B.A. and Ph.D. from the University of Michigan, where he taught for over 40 years. He is the father of Wilfrid Sellars.

In his 1969 book Reflections on American Philosophy From Within he described his views on materialism as evolutionary materialism, an extension to his 1922 groundbreaking book Evolutionary Naturalism.

He helped draft the Humanist Manifesto in 1933 and also signed the Humanist Manifesto II in 1973. Sellars was a supporter of socialism, saying that socialism was a democratic conception of economic organisation which "will give the maximum possible at any one time of justice and liberty".

See also
American philosophy
List of American philosophers

References

External links

Biography at Notable American Unitarians
Biography mirror 
Bibliography of Roy Wood Sellars

Roy Wood Sellars 1880–1973, by William K. Frankena, Proceedings and Addresses of the American Philosophical Association, Vol. 47, 1973–74, pp. 230–32.
 
 

1880 births
1973 deaths
American humanists
20th-century American philosophers
University of Michigan faculty
University of Michigan alumni
American socialists